Brian or Bryan Fisher or Fischer may refer to:

Brian Fisher (biologist), field biologist
Brian Fisher (baseball) (born 1962), Major League Baseball pitcher
Bryan Fisher (born 1980), actor
Brian S. Fischer, prison officer
Bryan Fischer (born 1951), U.S. sociopolitical commentator